Lake Warren State Park is a  state park located  southwest of Hampton, South Carolina, United States.  Its main attraction is Lake Warren itself, which is locally popular for fishing, boating, and bird-watching.  An additional smaller pond, a playground, and picnic facilities are located within the park.  Primarily used for daylight hours, camping is allowed but is restricted to primitive sites.

References

External links
Official state park website

Protected areas of Hampton County, South Carolina
State parks of South Carolina
Civilian Conservation Corps in South Carolina